Ignjat is a Serbo-Croatian masculine given name, a shortened form of Ignjatije (a variant of the Latin name Ignatius, from ignis, "fire"). It may refer to:

 Ignjat Đurđević, Ragusan Croatian baroque poet and translator.
 Ignjat Fischer, Croatian architect.
 Ignjat Granitz, Croatian Jewish industrialist, philanthropist and publisher.
 Ignjat Job, Croatian painter from Dubrovnik.
 Ignjat Kirhner (1877–1944), Austro-Hungarian lieutenant, Serbian World War I volunteer, Yugoslav brigadier-general
 Ignjat Sopron, Serbian journalist, publisher, and printer.
  (1812–1878), Serbian educator
 Ignác Martinovics (Ignjat Martinović), Hungarian philosopher, political adventurer of Serb origin.
 Ignác Gyulay (Ignjat Đulaj), Hungarian military officer.

Family names 
 Ignjatić
 Ignjatović

References

External links
 
 

Croatian masculine given names
Serbian masculine given names